Alconbury Weston – in Huntingdonshire (now part of Cambridgeshire), England – is a village and civil parish, lying just outside of the Fens, having just a few hills, but a significant change to the flat of the Fens.

History
Alconbury Weston was listed as Westune in the Domesday Book in the Hundred of Leightonstone in Huntingdonshire; the name of the settlement was written  in the Domesday Book. In 1086 there was just one manor at Alconbury Weston; the annual rent paid to the lord of the manor in 1066 had been £1 and the rent was the same in 1086. There were four households with an estimated population of 14 to 20. There was one ploughland at Alconbury Weston in 1086 and that there was the capacity for a further one ploughland, and a total tax assessed of one geld.

Government
Alconbury Weston parish council is the lowest tier of government and consists of seven members. The second tier of local government is Huntingdonshire District Council which is a non-metropolitan district of Cambridgeshire and has its headquarters in Huntingdon. Alconbury Weston is a part of the district ward of Alconbury and The Stukeleys and is represented on the district council by one councillor. The highest tier of local government is Cambridgeshire County Council. Alconbury Weston is a part of the electoral division of Huntingdon and is represented on the county council by two councillors. 

Alconbury Weston was in the historic and administrative county of Huntingdonshire until 1965. From 1965, the village was part of the new administrative county of Huntingdon and Peterborough. Then in 1974, following the Local Government Act 1972, Alconbury Weston became a part of the county of Cambridgeshire.

At Westminster, Alconbury Weston is in the parliamentary constituency of Huntingdon. Since 2001 Alconbury Weston has been represented in the House of Commons by Jonathan Djanogly (Conservative).

Geography
The Alconbury Brook runs through the village then through Alconbury and on into Hinchingbrooke Park. The brook has a history of flooding, with the village being affected numerous times in the 20th and 21st centuries.

Location

Climate
The climate in the United Kingdom is defined as a temperate oceanic climate, or Cfb on the Köppen climate classification system, a classification it shares with most of northwest Europe. Eastern areas of the United Kingdom, such as East Anglia, are drier, cooler, less windy and also experience the greatest daily and seasonal temperature variations. Protected from the cool onshore coastal breezes further to the east of the region, Cambridgeshire is warm in summer, and cold and frosty in winter.

The average annual rainfall for the United Kingdom between 1981 and 2010 was  but Cambridgeshire is one of the driest counties with around half of the national level. Regional weather forecasting and historical summaries are available from the UK Met Office. Additional local weather stations report periodic figures to the internet such as Weather Underground, Inc.

Demography

Population
In the period 1801 to 1901 the population of Alconbury Weston was recorded every ten years by the UK census.  During this time the population was in the range of 281 (the lowest in 1801) and 561 (the highest in 1861).

From 1901, a census was taken every ten years with the exception of 1941 (due to the Second World War).

All population census figures from report Historic Census figures Cambridgeshire to 2011 by Cambridgeshire Insight.

Culture and community
The brook is home to a number of water birds such as Mallard, Swan and Wren and the stream is also home to small fish such as Roach and also larger predatory fish such as Pike.

The village used to contain a Butchers, Farm Shop, Freezer Shop, post office and Master Saddlers which have all now shut down.  It has one pub, The White Hart

References

External links

Villages in Cambridgeshire
Huntingdonshire
Civil parishes in Cambridgeshire